Gdańsk Główny (Polish for Gdańsk main station) is the chief railway station serving the city of Gdańsk, in the Pomeranian Voivodeship, Poland. The station opened in 1900 and is located on the Warsaw–Gdańsk railway, Gdańsk–Stargard railway, the parallel Gdańsk Śródmieście–Rumia railway, Gdańsk Główny–Gdańsk Zaspa Towarowa railway and Gdańsk Główny–Gdańsk Nowy Port railway. The train services are operated by PKP, Polregio and SKM Tricity. Koleje Mazowieckie trains operate here during the summer.

History
The first railway line in Gdańsk opened in 1852. Around 1867, in the area of today's main railway station (Główny) a small, temporary passenger terminal Danzig Hohes Tor (Gdańsk Brama Wyżynna) was built. Access to it was only from the west, from the so-called. "Promenade" (ul. 3 Maja). To the east of the station the city separated because of the modern fortifications and moat of Gdańsk. The station could begin to expand after filling up the old moat and demolishing the western bastions.

The existing station was built between 1894 and 1900, with the official opening on 30 October 1900. The station shares its design with Colmar station in Alsace, France, which was part of the German Empire at the time as well.

In 1945 the station was set on fire and was restored after World War II. The tower escaped the fire.

On 2 January 1952 the SKM Trojmiasto suburban railway was opened, parallel to the existing line between Gdańsk and Gdynia.

The station features five island platforms, of which three function for the regional commuter SKM services and the other two for long-distance services and regional services. Access to the platforms is via subways from the east and west sides of the city. On the east side, the subway ends on the other side of Podwale Grodzkie street, and on the west side, it goes directly into the PKS (long-distance bus) station. Connecting tunnels enable access to the station building and tram stops, and contain shops, fast food bars, newsagents, and other kiosks.

Station building

Nowadays there is a small shopping centre on the patio, and a McDonald's and KFC inside the terminal. Ticket offices are open all day, and the station sells international as well as domestic tickets.

Modernisation
In the early 1990s, during the general overhaul of the train station, a two-level hall was built for shops. This did not prove popular and was demolished in 2013.

Modernisation work is set to take place in early 2017. The work will remove changes made to the northern part of the building, replace windows and doors, update the passenger information system, security systems, introduce escalators, renewed lifts and an extension of the tunnel located to the east of the station. The estimated cost of the reconstruction will amount to about 50 million zł, and will take about 18 months.

In terms of the reconstruction of the railway infrastructure, PKP PLK plans to overhaul long-distance platforms 1 and 2 and the tunnels, replace lighting (preserving their historical shapes) and installation of passenger information systems, elevators and escalators.

Train services
The station is served by the following services:

EuroCity services (EC) (EC 95 by DB) (IC by PKP) Gdynia - Gdansk - Bydgoszcz - Poznan - Rzepin - Frankfurt (Oder) - Berlin
EuroCity services (EC) Gdynia - Gdansk - Malbork - Warsaw - Katowice - Bohumin - Ostrava - Prerov - Breclav - Vienna
Express Intercity Premium services (EIP) Gdynia - Warsaw
Express Intercity Premium services (EIP) Gdynia - Warsaw - Katowice - Gliwice/Bielsko-Biała
Express Intercity Premium services (EIP) Gdynia/Kołobrzeg - Warsaw - Kraków (- Rzeszów)
Intercity services (IC) Gdynia - Gdansk - Bydgoszcz - Poznań - Wrocław - Opole - Katowice - Kraków - Rzeszów - Przemyśl
Intercity services (IC) Gdynia - Gdańsk - Bydgoszcz - Toruń - Kutno - Łódź - Częstochowa - Katowice - Bielsko-Biała
Intercity services (IC) Gdynia - Gdańsk - Bydgoszcz - Łódź - Czestochowa — Krakow — Zakopane
Intercity services (IC) Gdynia - Gdańsk - Bydgoszcz - Poznań - Zielona Góra
Intercity services (IC) Gdynia - Gdańsk - Bydgoszcz - Poznań - Wrocław 
 Intercity services (IC) Łódź Fabryczna — Warszawa — Gdańsk Glowny — Kołobrzeg
Intercity services (IC) Szczecin - Koszalin - Słupsk - Gdynia - Gdańsk
Intercity services (IC) Szczecin - Koszalin - Słupsk - Gdynia - Gdańsk - Elbląg/Iława - Olsztyn
Intercity services (IC) Szczecin - Koszalin - Słupsk - Gdynia - Gdańsk - Elbląg - Olsztyn - Białystok
Intercity services (TLK) Gdynia Główna — Kostrzyn 
Intercity services (TLK) Gdynia Główna — Warszawa — Krakow — Zakopane 
Intercity services (TLK) Kołobrzeg — Gdynia Główna — Warszawa Wschodnia — Kraków Główny
Regional services (R) Tczew — Gdynia Chylonia 
Regional services (R) Tczew — Słupsk  
Regional services (R) Malbork — Słupsk  
Regional services (R) Malbork — Gdynia Chylonia 
Regional services (R) Elbląg — Gdynia Chylonia 
Regional services (R) Elbląg — Słupsk  
Regional services (R) Chojnice — Tczew — Gdynia Główna 
Regional services (R) Gdynia Chylonia — Olsztyn Główny
Regional services (R) Gdynia Chylonia — Smętowo 
Regional services (R) Gdynia Chylonia — Laskowice Pomorskie 
Regional services (R) Gdynia Chylonia — Bydgoszcz Główna 
Regional services (R) Słupsk — Bydgoszcz Główna 
Regional services (R) Gdynia Chylonia — Pruszcz Gdański 
Pomorska Kolej Metropolitalna services (R) Kartuzy — Gdańsk Port Lotniczy (Airport) — Gdańsk Główny 
Szybka Kolej Miejska w Trójmieście services (SKM) (Lębork  -) Wejherowo - Reda - Rumia - Gdynia - Sopot - Gdansk

Gallery

See also
Rail transport in Poland
List of busiest railway stations in Poland

References 

 This article is based upon a translation of the Polish language version as of October 2016.

External links

Glowny
Railway stations served by Szybka Kolej Miejska (Tricity)
Railway stations served by Przewozy Regionalne InterRegio
Railway stations in Poland opened in 1900